Merbromin (marketed as Mercurochrome, Merbromine, Mercurocol, Sodium mercurescein, Asceptichrome, Supercrome, Brocasept and Cinfacromin) is an organomercuric disodium salt compound used as a topical antiseptic for minor cuts and scrapes and as a biological dye.  Readily available in most countries, it is no longer sold in Switzerland, Brazil, France, Iran, Germany, or the United States due to its mercury content.

Uses
Merbromin's best-known use is as a topical antiseptic to treat minor wounds, burns, and scratches. It is also used in the antisepsis of the umbilical cord and the antisepsis of wounds with inhibited scar formation, such as neuropathic ulcers and diabetic foot sores. When applied on a wound, it stains the skin a distinctive carmine red, which can persist through repeated washings. Due to its persistence and to its lethality to bacteria as an antiseptic, Merbromin is useful on infections of the fingernail or toenail.

The U.S. Food and Drug Administration in 1998 reclassified merbromin from "generally recognized as safe" to "untested," due to a lack of recent studies and updated supporting information. In the United States, its use has thus been superseded by other agents (e.g., povidone iodine, benzalkonium chloride, chloroxylenol).

Synthesis
Merbromin is synthesized by combining dibromofluorescein with mercuric acetate and sodium hydroxide or alternatively, through action of the mercuric acetate upon (or combining with) sodium dibromofluorescein.  Because of its anionic character, it is chemically incompatible with acids, the majority of alkaloid salts and most local anesthetics.

Mercurochrome
Merbromin is sold under the trade name Mercurochrome (where the suffix "- chrome" denotes "color"). The name is also commonly used for over-the-counter antiseptic solutions consisting of merbromin (typically at 2% concentration) dissolved in either ethyl alcohol (tincture) or water (aqueous). 

Its antiseptic qualities were discovered in 1918 by Hugh H. Young, a physician at Johns Hopkins Hospital. The chemical soon became popular among parents and physicians for everyday antiseptic uses, in part because the dye component made it possible to see where the antiseptic had been applied.

On 19 October 1998, citing potential for mercury poisoning, the Food and Drug Administration (FDA) reclassified merbromin from "generally recognized as safe" to "untested," effectively halting its distribution within the United States. Sales were subsequently halted in Brazil (2001), Germany (2003), and France (2006).  It remains readily available in most other countries.

Within the United States, products such as Humco Mercuroclear ("Aqueous solution of benzalkonium chloride and lidocaine hydrochloride") play on the brand recognition history of Mercurochrome but substitute other ingredients with similar properties. In Canada, Jean Coutu Group markets a chlorhexidine solution under the name Mercurochrome.

See also 
 Thiomersal, also known as Thimerosal or Merthiolate
 Nitromersol, an organomercury antiseptic and antifungal agent
 Phenyl mercuric nitrate

References

Antiseptics
Bromoarenes
Fluorone dyes
Organomercury compounds
Triarylmethane dyes
Organic sodium salts